Patricia  Marjorie Bartley, Mrs Brown (1 May 1917, Dacca, British India – 26 February 2021, Ely, Cambridgeshire) was a British codebreaker at Bletchley Park, and a member of British intelligence's diplomatic office in Mayfair, London. Among her contributions to the war effort was the breaking of the German diplomatic Floradora code, a task accomplished by a team she led.

Early life
Bartley was the eldest of four children of Sir Charles Bartley, a judge and a secretary to the government of Bengal, and Marjorie Hamilton. She was sent at age 10 to a boarding school in England, where she was unhappy. When her mother and siblings moved to France, she joined them in Saint-Jacut-de-la-Mer. She became fluent in German and French. The family then settled in Buckinghamshire.

In 1936, she started at Lady Margaret Hall, Oxford to read philosophy, politics and economics. Suffering from illness, she quit two years later. She was recruited by the notable cryptanalyst Emily Anderson, who was staying with her family. Her brother, Tony, joined the Royal Air Force, later becoming an ace pilot and the first husband of Deborah Kerr, who was her flatmate in London.

Career
By 1941, Bartley was the head of the German section of the Government Code and Cypher School (GC & CS) in London. Among her team of twelve was Dorothy Hyson, an American film actress. They were tasked with the breaking of a German diplomatic code, nick-named Floradora, intercepted in communication between Berlin and the German embassy in Dublin. She underplayed her contribution, but detected several regularities in five-figure subtraction ciphers that led a big reduction in the decoding effort.

Bartley was responsible for liaising on intelligence matters with the Americans, who were often happier to collaborate with her than with others at British intelligence. They were grateful for her insights into the Floradora code as well as her spotting of mistakes made by the Germans.

An American intelligence officer, William Friedman, wrote in his diary that Bartley had accidentally discovered the reciprocal nature of the German adder book, which was then proven by another member at Bletchley Park, De Grey. By August 1942, Bartley and her team were able to read all German diplomatic communications between Berlin and Dublin. A male subordinate attempted to take credit for her work, but this was dismissed by Alastair Denniston, Bartley's superior, who also arranged for letters of commendation for her from MI5 and the cabinet office. Facing considerable pressure from male colleagues who sought to undermine her and with her own overwork, she suffered from a breakdown and quit the GC & CS in 1943. After the war, she joined the Foreign Office, possibly the anti-communist propaganda section called Information Research Department. During this time, she met Denys Brown, whom she married in 1954.

Later life
She accompanied her husband to the Suez Canal when he was posted there as a diplomat. During the Israeli invasion of the canal in 1956, they were forced to flee. Denys Brown was later posted to Yugoslavia, Sweden and West Germany. Patricia Bartley found that the diplomatic wife's role was a full-time one, disconnecting her from her own intellectual pursuits. However, she did contribute two chapters in a history of the GCHQ describing her section, as well as write newspaper reviews of codebreaking-related books.

The Browns had two children, Andrew, a writer, and Iona. After Denys Brown retired, he and Bartley lived in Godalming, Surrey. Brown died in 1997. Bartley moved to Saffron Walden then to Ely. She died on February 26, 2021, aged 103.

References 

1917 births
2021 deaths
People from Dhaka
Bletchley Park women
GCHQ cryptographers
British centenarians
Women centenarians
British people in colonial India
Bletchley Park people